Scleropterus is a genus of beetles belonging to the family Curculionidae.

Species:
 Scleropterus offensus
 Scleropterus serratus

References

Curculionidae
Curculionidae genera